Craig McEwan (born 13 April 1982) is a Scottish boxer raised in Wester Hailes, Edinburgh, Scotland. He began attending boxing classes at Clovenstone Amateur Boxing Club, aged seven, coached by his father Rab. McEwan turned professional in 2006 and is currently fighting at middleweight. He holds a career record of 21 wins, with 10 by way of knockout and four losses.

Amateur career
McEwan had his first competitive bout at age eleven. During his teenage years, McEwan developed into one of Scotland's top amateur boxers. In his thirteen years as an amateur boxer, he fought three hundred and seventy-six matches, won ten gold medals in international tournaments, and regularly captained the Scottish International Team. On several occasions, he was crowned Scottish champion at both junior and senior level, as well as being European Junior Champion and Senior British & Irish Four Nations Champion. He has twice represented Scotland in the Commonwealth Games, winning a bronze medal in 2002. In 2005, McEwan broke Scotland's amateur boxing record by winning three gold medals at the international level.

Professional career
McEwan is a highly touted prospect and his talent and skills were enough to be signed by promoter Oscar De La Hoya as Golden Boy Promotions' first Scottish fighter. McEwan previously fought out of The Wild Card gym in Hollywood, where he was trained by world-renowned trainer Freddie Roach.

In a fight on 12 March 2011 against Irish boxer Andy Lee, billed "The Celtic War", McEwan, after an almost perfect boxing performance, was convincingly knocked out in the 10th round by a left hook. Two of the fight's judges had the match scored even while one had McEwan with a slight edge.

On 5 November 2011, McEwan was knocked out by Peter Quillin in the sixth round of their fight in Cancún, Mexico. McEwan protested the decision, claiming referee Manolo Alcocer stopped the fight too early.

In early 2012, his contract was not renewed by Golden Boy and he returned to the UK.

On 3 November 2012, McEwan suffered the third loss of his professional career when he lost a split decision in the quarter final of a prizefighter tournament to a decorated Nigerian amateur boxing champion who went by the name of Larry Ekundayo (5–0). Ekundayo went on to win the tournament.

In April 2013, he signed a four-fight deal with New York-based promoter, Lou DiBella.

In December 2013, he lost a Unanimous Decision to American Dashon Johnson in New York. McEwan cited lack of support from his promoter & proper preparation following an extended absence from the ring, even struggling to organise sparring partners prior to the fight.

Professional boxing record

References

External links
 Craigs Page on MySpace
 British Boxing Bio
 
 Official Web Site

1982 births
Living people
Boxers from Edinburgh
Scottish male boxers
Commonwealth Games medallists in boxing
Commonwealth Games bronze medallists for Scotland
Boxers at the 2002 Commonwealth Games
Middleweight boxers
Medallists at the 2002 Commonwealth Games